is a newly created district located in Hidaka Subprefecture, Hokkaido, Japan.

As of October 31, 2006, the district has an estimated population of 27,150 and a density of 23.7 persons per km2. The total area is 1,147.74 km2.

Towns and villages 
Shinhidaka - merger of the former towns of Mitsuishi (from the former Mitsuishi District) and Shizunai (from the former Shizunai District)

Districts in Hokkaido